Clyst Vale Community College is a school in Broadclyst, East Devon near Exeter in England, UK. Since April 2011 it has been an academy.

The school is a Microsoft partnership school and therefore specialises in ICT as well as Mathematics and Science. The buildings cater for secondary education from ages 11 to 16 as well as being a sixth form college where people can study for A levels, NVQs and GNVQs. It also acts as an extracurricular college for those of the school and of the community offering after-school hours classes such as Carpentry , Music and Art

Notable former pupils
Jim Causley - Musician (born 1980) -
Luke Newberry - Actor (born 1990) - 
Abbie Brown (rugby union) (born 1996) -

Secondary schools in Devon
Academies in Devon